Canning Fok Kin-ning; born 1951 in Hong Kong) is a Hong Kong business executive. He is a director or chair of numerous management board in companies of Cheung Kong Holdings and Hutchison Whampoa. He is hailed as the "King of Employees" since he has been one of the Hong Kong's top-five taxpayers in the past few years.

Education 
Fok holds a Bachelor of Arts degree from St. John's University in Minnesota, United States, and a diploma in financial management from the University of New England in New South Wales, Australia. He is a member of the Australian Institute of Chartered Accountants.

Career 
Fok is considered Li Ka-shing's right-hand man, and has worked alongside the business magnate for over 40 years as his trusted lieutenant and dealmaker.

Positions 
Fok worked as the following positions of the following companies.
Group Co-managing Director of CK Hutchison Holdings
Deputy Chairman of Cheung Kong Infrastructure
Chairman of Hongkong Electric Holdings
Chairman of Hutchison Harbour Ring
Chairman of Hutchison Telecommunications International Limited
Chairman of Orange plc
Chairman of TPG Telecom Limited
Chairman of Hongkong International Terminals Limited
Chairman of Partner Communications
Co-chairman of Husky Energy
Deputy Chief Commissioner of Indosat Ooredoo Hutchison

Philanthropy 
Fok endowed the Canning and Eliza Fok House, a graduate residence at Murray Edwards College, Cambridge. He also endowed the Eliza and Canning Fok Endowed Fund for International Student Financial Aid at Columbia College, the undergraduate liberal arts college of Columbia University.

References

1952 births
Living people
Hong Kong chief executives
Hong Kong financial businesspeople
Chinese accountants
College of Saint Benedict and Saint John's University alumni
University of New England (Australia) alumni
CK Hutchison Holdings people